ITU G.992.3 is an ITU (International Telecommunication Union) standard, also referred to as ADSL2 or G.dmt.bis. It optionally extends the capability of basic ADSL in data rates to 12 Mbit/s downstream and, depending on Annex version, up to 3.5 Mbit/s upstream (with a mandatory capability of ADSL2 transceivers of 8 Mbit/s downstream and 800 kbit/s upstream). ADSL2 uses the same bandwidth as ADSL but achieves higher throughput via improved modulation techniques. Actual speeds may decrease depending on line quality; usually the most significant factor in line quality is the distance from the DSLAM to the customer's equipment.

Annex versions
ADSL2 has multiple modes for DSL providers to offer services for different needs. Below is a list of available features based on ADSL2 specs from the ITU standards.

See also
 ADSL
 ADSL2+
 List of interface bit rates
 Wetting current

References

External links
ITU-T Recommendation G.992.3: Asymmetric digital subscriber line transceivers 2 (ADSL2)

Digital subscriber line
ITU-T recommendations
ITU-T G Series Recommendations
Telecommunications-related introductions in 2002